Vilna may refer to:

Places
 Vilnius, capital of Lithuania (Vilna in several languages)
 Vilnia River, a river in Lithuania
 Vilna Governorate, a governorate (guberniya) of the Russian Empire
 Vilna, Alberta, a village in Canada

Other uses
 Vilna Gaon, rabbi, Talmud scholar, and Kabbalist
 Vilna Troupe, a Yiddish theatrical company
 Vilna Group, a circle of Jewish Social-Democrats founded in the mid-1890s
 Vilna Edition Shas, the most common printed edition of the Talmud still in use today

See also
 Wilno (disambiguation)
 Wilna (disambiguation)
Vilnia